Sunshine and Gold is a 1917 American silent drama film directed by Henry King and starring Marie Osborne, Henry King, and Daniel Gilfether.

Cast
 Marie Osborne as Little Mary 
 Henry King as The Chauffeur 
 Daniel Gilfether as James Andrews 
 Neil Hardin as Dr. Andrews, His Son 
 Arma Carlton

References

Bibliography
 Donald W. McCaffrey & Christopher P. Jacobs. Guide to the Silent Years of American Cinema. Greenwood Publishing, 1999.

External links

1917 films
1917 drama films
Silent American drama films
Films directed by Henry King
American silent feature films
1910s English-language films
Pathé Exchange films
American black-and-white films
1910s American films